Poomukhapadiyil Ninneyum Kaathu is a 1986 Indian Malayalam-language film, directed by Bhadran, starring Mammootty, Cecily, Rahman, and Srividya. Mohanlal appeared in a guest appearance. The film tells the story of Sanjay (Rahman) and Cecily (Cecily). The film was remade in Tamil as Konjum Kili, with Raghuvaran and Srividya.

Plot
Poomukhapadiyil Ninneyum Kaathu tells the story of troubled marital life, due to one partner's unnecessary doubt of another, causing mental agony to their children, and bringing tragic ends to their lives.

Cast
Mammootty  as Dr. Issac Peter
Rahman as Sanjay / Sanju
Cecily as Cecily Issac
Srividya  as Clara Issac
Thilakan as Vasu Pillai
Sulakshana as Ammukutty
Adoor Bhavani as Therutha Chettathy
Kumbalangi Beena as Pennamma, Clara's Servant
Mohanlal as Pauly (Guest appearance)

Soundtrack

References

External links 

1980s Malayalam-language films
1986 films
Films scored by Ilaiyaraaja
Malayalam films remade in other languages
Films directed by Bhadran